Ahsanul Kabir (born 30 November 1998) is an Indian cricketer. He made his List A debut on 1 March 2021, for Manipur in the 2020–21 Vijay Hazare Trophy.

References

External links
 

1998 births
Living people
Indian cricketers
Manipur cricketers
Place of birth missing (living people)